HAT-P-2b is an extrasolar planet detected by the HATNet Project in May 2007. It orbits a class F star HAT-P-2, (bigger and hotter than the Sun), located about 420 light-years away in the constellation Hercules. 

The planet is officially named Magor. The name was selected in the NameExoWorlds campaign by Hungary, during the 100th anniversary of the International Astronomical Union. Magor was a legendary ancestor of the Magyar people and the Hungarian nation, and brother of Hunor (name of the star HAT-P-2).

Physical properties
Its small size, despite the bloating of the planet's atmosphere, is caused by the strong gravity of the planet. The planetary atmosphere has indeed the smallest scale height, equal to 26km, among exoplanets with measurable atmospheres as at 2021.

This indicates its mean density is twice that of Earth and its surface gravity approximately 24 times that on Earth, almost equal to the Sun. 

In addition to heat from its primary star, tidal heating is thought to have played a significant role in this planet's evolution.

Orbit
Planetary orbital period is 5 days 15 hours, and inclination is such what it crosses directly in front of the star as viewed from Earth. The orbit is very eccentric, ranging from 4.90 million to 15.36 million miles from the star.

As of August 2008, the most recent calculation of HAT-P-2b's Rossiter–McLaughlin effect and so spin-orbit angle was that of Winn in 2007 but Loeillet has in 2008 disputed it. For Winn this is +1 ± 13 degrees. The study in 2012, have determined the planetary orbit is probably aligned with the equatorial plane of the star, misalignment equal to 9°.

Other planets in system
It has been suggested that there is a second outer planet perturbing HAT-P-2b, although thus far, this has neither been proven or disproven.

References

External links

The Extrasolar Planets Encyclopaedia
The Israeli Team From Tel Aviv University

Hercules (constellation)
Hot Jupiters
Transiting exoplanets
Giant planets
Exoplanets discovered in 2007
Exoplanets with proper names
Exoplanets discovered by HATNet